The Sail Rock is a rock in Hengchun Township, Pingtung County, Taiwan. The rock is part of Kenting National Park.

Name
The name of the rock is derived from its shape which resembles a sailing ship.

History
The rock broke off from the nearby table connecting it to Pingtung mainland.

See also
 Geology of Taiwan

References

Landforms of Pingtung County
Rock formations of Taiwan